General elections were held in Trinidad and Tobago on 24 September 1956. 129 candidates from nine political parties contested for 24 seats in the legislative council. The result was a victory for the People's National Movement, which won 13 of the 24 seats. Voter turnout was 80.1%.

In one of the biggest races in the 1956 general election, West Indies cricketer Learie Constantine of the PNM defeated Radio Trinidad announcer Surujpat Mathura of the PDP in Tunapuna.

Results

References

Trinidad
1956 in Trinidad and Tobago
Elections in Trinidad and Tobago